Basheerbagh  is a city center of importance in Hyderabad. Now it is a commercial and business center . The area's importance has increased because of its close proximity to other bigger commercial areas such as Abids, Koti, Nampally and Himayat Nagar. The well known Bashir Bagh Palace was located here. It is also close to Hussain Sagar Lake.

History
Basheerbagh is named after Bashir-ud-Daula Nawab Sir Asman Jah Bahadur. The Bashir Bagh Palace was built by him in this area in 1880.

Commercial area
There are large number of Jewellery shops located here and good number of shopping malls around here. Famous theaters in the city such as the Skyline & Sterling movie theaters were located here. Some important government buildings like the Ayakar Bhavan (Income tax office), Police Commissioner's Office, Police control room, Central Excise and customs and Goods and services tax office, Telangana Tourism's reservation office etc. are located here. Huge commercial buildings like the Babu Khan Estate (once it was the tallest building in Hyderabad with 14 floors) and Khan Lateef Khan Estate are present here running a wide variety of businesses.

Education

The well known Nizam College and club is located in this suburb.

Sports
Basheerbagh was a sports hub and the multipurpose L.B Stadium which is used for football and athletics is located here. It was previously called as Fateh Maidan, because the handing over of Hyderabad to the Indian Army had happened here. Earlier it was used to host international cricket matches. An indoor stadium is also present here used for Badminton and Tennis. Presently they are not used much and Gachibowli has become the sports hub of the city.

The rebel ICL matches have revived the stadiums here and they have once again come alive. The flood lights of the stadium light up the evening sky and have caused joy to the public around this area after many years.

Public transport

TSRTC connects Basheerbagh to other parts of Hyderabad and Secunderabad. Autos and taxis are common forms of public transport here. 
The nearest Hyderabad Multi-Modal Transport System train station is at Nampally which is a kilometer away from Basheerbagh.

Landmarks
The landmarks of the city are:

 The Lal Bahadur Stadium
 Babukhan estate
 Police control room
 Old Gandhi Medical College
 Hyderabad Nursing Home
 Madhava Reddy Memorial Flyover
 Police Commissioner's office
 Income Tax Department office (Aaykar Bhavan)

References

Neighbourhoods in Hyderabad, India